The Louis Couperus Museum is a museum located in the Archipelbuurt neighbourhood of The Hague. The museum celebrates the life and work of the Belle Époque writer Louis Couperus.

Location 
The museum was founded in 1996 by Caroline de Westenholz, step daughter of Albert Vogel jr. (1924-1982), a biographer of Couperus, and housed in his former art gallery.  The museum, which is located at Javastraat 17, is within walking distance of a number of addresses where Louis Couperus has lived himself, including:

 Mauritskade, where Couperus was born in 1863.
 Nassauplein 4, which served as the residence of the Couperus family from 1878 to 1893. It was here that Couperus wrote the poems that would form part of his debut anthology .
 Surinamestraat 20, where Couperus' wrote his debut novel, Eline Vere. Later this was the home of writer, lawyer and politician Conrad Theodor van Deventer. It was the intention to move the Louis Couperus Museum to this place but because the Foundation Couperushuis Surinamestraat could not raise enough funds to buy the house, it is still for sale. Permission to place a commemorative plaque on the house was not granted.

The museum 

The museum houses various objects related to Couperus, such as manuscripts and personal belongings. The rooms are stylistically designed to give the impression of how the residence would have appeared in Couperus' day and age. It features Couperus' desk, and a portrait of his father, John Ricus Couperus. Twice a year the museum organises exhibitions on themes concerning Couperus' work or life. In addition to the themed exhibitions, the museum organises walking-tours along places of significance to Couperus and his work, such as the houses where characters from his novels lived.

Couperus' desk, manuscripts and personal letters form part of the collection of the Letterkundig Museum. Other items, such as Couperus' collected publications and a life-sized mannequin of Couperus, belong to the collection of the museum itself.

See also

References

 John Sillevis and Caroline de Westenholz, Louis Couperus Museum 1996-2001. Een uitgave van het Louis Couperus Museum ter gelegenheid van het vijfjarig bestaan op 10 juni 2001. Den Haag, 2001
 Louis Couperus Museum 1996-2006. Een uitgave van het Louis Couperus Museum ter gelegenheid van het tienjarig bestaan op 10 juni 1906. Den Haag, 2006
Louis Couperus Museum

External links
 Webpage for Louis Couperus Museum

Museums in The Hague